William Gemmell Devan (23 February 1909 – 12 December 1966) was a Scottish professional footballer. He played as an inside forward in the English Football League, Scottish Football League and Irish Football League. He played four games, scoring once, during Watford's run in the 1937 Football League Third Division South Cup, but did not play in the final itself. He retired due to injury in 1938, but returned to Watford as a coach in 1958.

References

1909 births
1966 deaths
Footballers from Ayr
Scottish Football League players
NIFL Premiership players
English Football League players
Ayr United F.C. players
Ards F.C. players
Coleraine F.C. players
Linfield F.C. players
Watford F.C. players
Watford F.C. non-playing staff
Scottish footballers
Association football forwards